Areyto is the second EP by Puerto Rican progressive metal band Puya, released digitally in 2010.

Background
Puya disbanded in 2002 while several members worked on their own projects. Guitarist Ramon Ortiz played with Ankla, a band based in Los Angeles, bassist Harold Hopkins Miranda played in Yeva out of Puerto Rico, Ed Paniagua toured as a drummer with various solo artists, while Sergio Curbelo went back to school for graphic computer arts in Miami. Areyto is the band's first release since 2001

Track listing
 "Ni Antes Ni Despues" (Ramon Ortiz) - 4:21
 "No Hay Mal Que Por Bien No Venga" (Ortiz) - 4:34
 "Areyto" (Harold Hopkins)- 3:51
 "La Muralla" (feat. Tito Auger, Tego Calderón, Mimi Maura & El Topo) - 5:36
 "Hecho El Resto"  (Ortiz, Hopkins) - 4:03

References

2010 albums
Puya (band) albums